Genterovci is a settlement north of Lendava in the Prekmurje region of Slovenia. It lies on the border with Hungary.

References

External links
Genterovci on Geopedia

Populated places in the Municipality of Lendava